Andrey Gridin (born June 23, 1988 in Kazakhstan) is a cross-country skier competing for Bulgaria. He competed for Bulgaria at the 2014 Winter Olympics in the cross-country skiing events, finishing 57th in the 30 km skiathlon and 41st in the 50 km competition.

Gridin originally competed for his native Kazakhstan in biathlon as well until 2012. He applied to get Bulgarian citizenship and has been competing for the country since March 2013.

References 

1988 births
Living people
Cross-country skiers at the 2014 Winter Olympics
Bulgarian male cross-country skiers
Kazakhstani male cross-country skiers
Olympic cross-country skiers of Bulgaria
Kazakhstani male biathletes
Naturalised citizens of Bulgaria
21st-century Kazakhstani people
21st-century Bulgarian people